Yeniyapan can refer to:

 Yeniyapan, Kızılırmak
 Yeniyapan, Uğurludağ